The 1997–98 NBA season was the Raptors' third season in the National Basketball Association. In the 1997 NBA draft, the Raptors selected high school basketball star Tracy McGrady with the ninth overall pick, and acquired second-year forward John Wallace from the New York Knicks during the off-season. In November, Isiah Thomas resigned as the team's General Manager, and later took up a job as color analyst for the NBA on NBC. After a 1–2 start, the Raptors struggled posting a 17-game losing streak leading to a dreadful 1–19 start. The team later on improved in January with a 6–8 record, including a four-game winning streak, and held an 11–36 record at the All-Star break.

At midseason, scoring leader Damon Stoudamire was traded along with Walt Williams, and Carlos Rogers to the Portland Trail Blazers in exchange for Kenny Anderson, Gary Trent and rookie guard Alvin Williams, as head coach Darrell Walker resigned after 49 games. However, Anderson refused to play for the Canadian team and was dealt along with Popeye Jones, and Žan Tabak to the Boston Celtics in exchange for top draft pick Chauncey Billups and Dee Brown. The team also released Shawn Respert to free agency, where he later on signed as a free agent with the Dallas Mavericks. Under interim Butch Carter, the Raptors continued to struggle posting a 5–28 record for the remainder of the season, and finishing last place in the Central Division with a franchise worst record of 16–66.

Doug Christie averaged 16.5 points, 5.2 rebounds and 2.4 steals per game, while Wallace averaged 14.0 points and 4.5 rebounds per game, and second-year star Marcus Camby provided the team with 12.1 points, 7.4 rebounds and led the league with 3.7 blocks per game. In addition, Reggie Slater contributed 8.0 points and 3.9 rebounds per game, while McGrady provided with 7.0 points and 4.2 rebounds per game off the bench, and Miller averaged 6.3 points and rebounds per game each.

This was also the Raptors' final full season playing at the SkyDome. Following the season, Camby was traded to the New York Knicks, while Billups was traded to the Denver Nuggets, Trent signed as a free agent with the Dallas Mavericks, Oliver Miller was released to free agency, and Sharone Wright, who only played just seven games this season due to an off-season car accident, retired after only playing just four seasons in the NBA.

Draft picks

Roster

Regular season
In February 1998, Damon Stoudamire was traded by the Raptors along with Walt Williams and Carlos Rogers to the Portland Trail Blazers, for Kenny Anderson, Alvin Williams, Gary Trent, two first-round draft choices, a second-round draft choice and an amount of money. Anderson refused to report to the team, because he did not want to play in Canada. He was then sent along with Popeye Jones and Žan Tabak to the Boston Celtics for Chauncey Billups, Dee Brown, John Thomas and Roy Rogers.

Highs
In his second year Marcus Camby lead the league in blocks with 3.7 per game

Lows

A seventeen-game losing streak at the start of the season.
Their season was over before it even started.

Season standings

Record vs. opponents

Game log

|- bgcolor="ffcccc"
| 1
| October 31
| @ Miami
| 
| Doug Christie, Walt Williams (18)
| Marcus Camby (12)
| Walt Williams (4)
| Miami Arena14,795
| 0-1

|- bgcolor="ffcccc"
| 2
| November 1
| @ Atlanta
| 
| Damon Stoudamire (21)
| Popeye Jones (7)
| Damon Stoudamire (6)
| Alexander Memorial Coliseum8,539
| 0-2
|- bgcolor="bbffbb"
| 3
| November 4
| Golden State
| 
| John Wallace (17)
| Doug Christie (8)
| Damon Stoudamire (13)
| SkyDome16,624
| 1-2
|- bgcolor="ffcccc"
| 4
| November 6
| Seattle
| 
| Damon Stoudamire (22)
| Marcus Camby (9)
| Damon Stoudamire (7)
| SkyDome15,459
| 1-3
|- bgcolor="ffcccc"
| 5
| November 8
| @ Orlando
| 
| Marcus Camby (17)
| Doug Christie (7)
| Damon Stoudamire (9)
| Orlando Arena17,248
| 1-4
|- bgcolor="ffcccc"
| 6
| November 10
| San Antonio
| 
| Doug Christie (26)
| Popeye Jones (12)
| Damon Stoudamire (13)
| SkyDome18,174
| 1-5
|- bgcolor="ffcccc"
| 7
| November 12
| New York
| 
| John Wallace (13)
| Popeye Jones (7)
| Damon Stoudamire (7)
| SkyDome18,143
| 1-6
|- bgcolor="ffcccc"
| 8
| November 14
| @ Boston
| 
| Walt Williams (25)
| Walt Williams (12)
| Damon Stoudamire (9)
| FleetCenter17,224
| 1-7
|- bgcolor="ffcccc"
| 9
| November 15
| Indiana
| 
| John Wallace (17)
| Tracy McGrady (11)
| Damon Stoudamire (14)
| SkyDome17,188
| 1-8
|- bgcolor="ffcccc"
| 10
| November 18
| Boston
| 
| John Wallace (30)
| John Wallace (12)
| Shawn Respert, Damon Stoudamire (6)
| SkyDome16,343
| 1-9
|- bgcolor="ffcccc"
| 11
| November 20
| @ Houston
| 
| Damon Stoudamire (25)
| Damon Stoudamire (11)
| Damon Stoudamire (4)
| Compaq Center16,285
| 1-10
|- bgcolor="ffcccc"
| 12
| November 22
| @ Miami
| 
| John Wallace (28)
| Žan Tabak (9)
| Damon Stoudamire (11)
| Miami Arena14,381
| 1-11
|- bgcolor="ffcccc"
| 13
| November 24
| Portland
| 
| Damon Stoudamire (29)
| Popeye Jones, Reggie Slater (7)
| Damon Stoudamire (11)
| SkyDome15,051
| 1-12
|- bgcolor="ffcccc"
| 14
| November 26
| Atlanta
| 
| John Wallace (30)
| Popeye Jones (16)
| Damon Stoudamire (13)
| SkyDome15,639
| 1-13
|- bgcolor="ffcccc"
| 15
| November 28
| @ Dallas
| 
| Doug Christie (27)
| John Wallace (10)
| Damon Stoudamire (6)
| Reunion Arena13,327
| 1-14
|- bgcolor="ffcccc"
| 16
| November 30
| @ L.A. Lakers
| 
| John Wallace (25)
| Popeye Jones (9)
| Damon Stoudamire (11)
| Great Western Forum14,940
| 1-15

|- bgcolor="ffcccc"
| 17
| December 3
| @ Utah
| 
| Damon Stoudamire (25)
| Oliver Miller (8)
| Oliver Miller (4)
| Delta Center19,590
| 1-16
|- bgcolor="ffcccc"
| 18
| December 5
| @ Phoenix
| 
| John Wallace (20)
| Oliver Miller (9)
| Damon Stoudamire (4)
| America West Arena19,023
| 1-17
|- bgcolor="ffcccc"
| 19
| December 7
| Detroit
| 
| John Wallace (23)
| Oliver Miller (9)
| Damon Stoudamire (9)
| SkyDome16,289
| 1-18
|- bgcolor="ffcccc"
| 20
| December 9
| Charlotte
| 
| Damon Stoudamire (20)
| Oliver Miller (12)
| Damon Stoudamire (7)
| SkyDome16,325
| 1-19
|- bgcolor="bbffbb"
| 21
| December 10
| @ Philadelphia
| 
| Walt Williams (39)
| Oliver Miller (11)
| Damon Stoudamire (14)
| CoreStates Center11,833
| 2-19
|- bgcolor="ffcccc"
| 22
| December 13
| @ Chicago
| 
| John Wallace (14)
| John Wallace (7)
| Chris Garner, Damon Stoudamire (3)
| United Center23,867
| 2-20
|- bgcolor="ffcccc"
| 23
| December 15
| Indiana
| 
| Marcus Camby (28)
| Oliver Miller (8)
| Damon Stoudamire (15)
| SkyDome14,562
| 2-21
|- bgcolor="ffcccc"
| 24
| December 17
| Boston
| 
| Tracy McGrady (17)
| Oliver Miller (8)
| Damon Stoudamire (5)
| SkyDome14,771
| 2-22
|- bgcolor="bbffbb"
| 25
| December 19
| Milwaukee
| 
| Damon Stoudamire (36)
| Marcus Camby (14)
| Damon Stoudamire (8)
| SkyDome15,076
| 3-22
|- bgcolor="ffcccc"
| 26
| December 20
| Washington
| 
| Marcus Camby, Damon Stoudamire (18)
| Damon Stoudamire (7)
| Damon Stoudamire (8)
| SkyDome15,434
| 3-23
|- bgcolor="ffcccc"
| 27
| December 22
| @ Charlotte
| 
| Damon Stoudamire (21)
| Doug Christie, Damon Stoudamire (7)
| Doug Christie (6)
| Charlotte Coliseum23,449
| 3-24
|- bgcolor="bbffbb"
| 28
| December 27
| @ New York
| 
| Damon Stoudamire (30)
| Reggie Slater (11)
| Damon Stoudamire (5)
| Madison Square Garden19,763
| 4-24
|- bgcolor="ffcccc"
| 29
| December 30
| @ Detroit
| 
| Damon Stoudamire (36)
| Oliver Miller (11)
| Damon Stoudamire (8)
| The Palace of Auburn Hills19,087
| 4-25
|- bgcolor="ffcccc"
| 30
| December 31
| @ Washington
| 
| Damon Stoudamire (19)
| Tracy McGrady, Damon Stoudamire (5)
| Damon Stoudamire (7)
| MCI Center19,651
| 4-26

|- bgcolor="ffcccc"
| 31
| January 2
| Detroit
| 
| Doug Christie (23)
| Doug Christie (8)
| Damon Stoudamire (16)
| SkyDome17,292
| 4-27
|- bgcolor="ffcccc"
| 32
| January 3
| @ Indiana
| 
| John Wallace (18)
| Oliver Miller (12)
| Damon Stoudamire (6)
| Market Square Arena16,259
| 4-28
|- bgcolor="ffcccc"
| 33
| January 5
| Houston
| 
| Oliver Miller (22)
| Doug Christie, Žan Tabak (7)
| Damon Stoudamire (12)
| SkyDome16,375
| 4-29
|- bgcolor="ffcccc"
| 34
| January 7
| Orlando
| 
| Damon Stoudamire (26)
| Doug Christie (12)
| Damon Stoudamire (7)
| SkyDome15,168
| 4-30
|- bgcolor="bbffbb"
| 35
| January 10
| @ Cleveland
| 
| Damon Stoudamire (34)
| Oliver Miller (11)
| Damon Stoudamire (7)
| Gund Arena17,864
| 5-30
|- bgcolor="ffcccc"
| 36
| January 12
| New Jersey
| 
| Damon Stoudamire (19)
| Marcus Camby (13)
| Damon Stoudamire (6)
| SkyDome14,376
| 5-31
|- bgcolor="bbffbb"
| 37
| January 14
| L.A. Clippers
| 
| Damon Stoudamire (36)
| Marcus Camby, Oliver Miller (6)
| Damon Stoudamire (11)
| SkyDome15,073
| 6-31
|- bgcolor="ffcccc"
| 38
| January 17
| New York
| 
| Marcus Camby (22)
| Carlos Rogers (11)
| Damon Stoudamire (10)
| SkyDome18,898
| 6-32
|- bgcolor="ffcccc"
| 39
| January 19
| @ Charlotte
| 
| Žan Tabak (23)
| Žan Tabak (7)
| Damon Stoudamire (12)
| Charlotte Coliseum21,934
| 6-33
|- bgcolor="bbffbb"
| 40
| January 21
| Sacramento
| 
| Damon Stoudamire (36)
| Marcus Camby (18)
| Damon Stoudamire (11)
| SkyDome14,212
| 7-33
|- bgcolor="bbffbb"
| 41
| January 24
| Minnesota
| 
| Doug Christie (31)
| Marcus Camby, Oliver Miller (12)
| Damon Stoudamire (10)
| SkyDome15,778
| 8-33
|- bgcolor="bbffbb"
| 42
| January 26
| Philadelphia
| 
| Doug Christie (26)
| Marcus Camby (10)
| Damon Stoudamire (8)
| SkyDome14,458
| 9-33
|- bgcolor="bbffbb"
| 43
| January 29
| @ Denver
| 
| Damon Stoudamire (22)
| Oliver Miller (8)
| Damon Stoudamire (5)
| McNichols Sports Arena9,629
| 10-33
|- bgcolor="ffcccc"
| 44
| January 30
| @ Sacramento
| 
| John Wallace (18)
| Marcus Camby, Carlos Rogers (6)
| Doug Christie, John Wallace (3)
| ARCO Arena14,170
| 10-34

|- bgcolor="ffcccc"
| 45
| February 1
| @ Portland
| 
| Damon Stoudamire (21)
| John Wallace (9)
| Damon Stoudamire (9)
| Rose Garden20,792
| 10-35
|- bgcolor="ffcccc"
| 46
| February 3
| Phoenix
| 
| Doug Christie, Walt Williams (24)
| Marcus Camby (10)
| Damon Stoudamire (8)
| SkyDome14,344
| 10-36
|- bgcolor="bbffbb"
| 47
| February 5
| Dallas
| 
| Damon Stoudamire (21)
| Marcus Camby (16)
| Damon Stoudamire (8)
| SkyDome14,292
| 11-36
|- bgcolor="ffcccc"
| 48
| February 10
| @ Chicago
| 
| Damon Stoudamire (19)
| Marcus Camby (11)
| Damon Stoudamire, Walt Williams (4)
| United Center23,881
| 11-37
|- bgcolor="ffcccc"
| 49
| February 12
| Cleveland
| 
| Doug Christie (26)
| Oliver Miller (8)
| Oliver Miller (10)
| SkyDome14,348
| 11-38
|- bgcolor="ffcccc"
| 50
| February 13
| @ New Jersey
| 
| John Wallace (29)
| John Wallace (12)
| John Wallace (6)
| Continental Airlines Arena14,263
| 11-39
|- bgcolor="ffcccc"
| 51
| February 15
| Miami
| 
| John Wallace (27)
| Tracy McGrady (8)
| Chris Garner (7)
| SkyDome16,888
| 11-40
|- bgcolor="ffcccc"
| 52
| February 19
| Chicago
| 
| John Wallace (19)
| Oliver Miller (7)
| Doug Christie (5)
| SkyDome30,172
| 11-41
|- bgcolor="ffcccc"
| 53
| February 20
| @ Milwaukee
| 
| Doug Christie (23)
| Marcus Camby (10)
| Oliver Miller (4)
| Bradley Center17,856
| 11-42
|- bgcolor="bbffbb"
| 54
| February 22
| Vancouver
| 
| Chauncey Billups (27)
| Gary Trent (15)
| Doug Christie (7)
| SkyDome16,932
| 12-42
|- bgcolor="ffcccc"
| 55
| February 26
| @ San Antonio
| 
| Doug Christie (17)
| Gary Trent (10)
| Oliver Miller (6)
| Alamodome13,978
| 12-43
|- bgcolor="bbffbb"
| 56
| February 27
| @ Orlando
| 
| Doug Christie (35)
| Marcus Camby (13)
| Dee Brown (9)
| Orlando Arena16,947
| 13-43

|- bgcolor="ffcccc"
| 57
| March 3
| Utah
| 
| Chauncey Billups (26)
| Gary Trent (7)
| Oliver Miller (8)
| SkyDome16,448
| 13-44
|- bgcolor="ffcccc"
| 58
| March 4
| @ Cleveland
| 
| Doug Christie (16)
| Marcus Camby, Oliver Miller (5)
| Dee Brown, John Wallace (4)
| Gund Arena15,017
| 13-45
|- bgcolor="ffcccc"
| 59
| March 6
| @ Minnesota
| 
| Chauncey Billups (20)
| Marcus Camby (9)
| Oliver Miller (4)
| Target Center18,156
| 13-46
|- bgcolor="ffcccc"
| 60
| March 8
| @ Vancouver
| 
| Dee Brown (21)
| Doug Christie (8)
| Oliver Miller (8)
| General Motors Place16,098
| 13-47
|- bgcolor="ffcccc"
| 61
| March 10
| @ Seattle
| 
| John Wallace (25)
| John Wallace (9)
| Doug Christie, John Wallace (5)
| KeyArena17,072
| 13-48
|- bgcolor="ffcccc"
| 62
| March 13
| @ L.A. Clippers
| 
| Reggie Slater (20)
| Oliver Miller (7)
| Oliver Miller (4)
| Los Angeles Memorial Sports Arena6,152
| 13-49
|- bgcolor="bbffbb"
| 63
| March 15
| @ Golden State
| 
| Doug Christie (24)
| Marcus Camby (16)
| Oliver Miller (4)
| The New Arena in Oakland13,063
| 14-49
|- bgcolor="ffcccc"
| 64
| March 17
| Atlanta
| 
| Doug Christie (30)
| Oliver Miller (9)
| Doug Christie (8)
| SkyDome16,546
| 14-50
|- bgcolor="bbffbb"
| 65
| March 19
| Denver
| 
| Dee Brown (24)
| Doug Christie (9)
| Dee Brown, Doug Christie, Oliver Miller (5)
| SkyDome14,274
| 15-50
|- bgcolor="ffcccc"
| 66
| March 20
| @ Detroit
| 
| Chauncey Billups (22)
| Marcus Camby (8)
| Doug Christie (7)
| The Palace of Auburn Hills22,076
| 15-51
|- bgcolor="ffcccc"
| 67
| March 22
| Chicago
| 
| John Wallace (26)
| Doug Christie, Tracy McGrady (9)
| Tracy McGrady (8)
| SkyDome33,216
| 15-52
|- bgcolor="ffcccc"
| 68
| March 24
| Charlotte
| 
| Marcus Camby (20)
| John Wallace (10)
| Chauncey Billups (6)
| SkyDome14,490
| 15-53
|- bgcolor="ffcccc"
| 69
| March 26
| Cleveland
| 
| Doug Christie (26)
| Marcus Camby (13)
| Doug Christie (8)
| SkyDome14,120
| 15-54
|- bgcolor="ffcccc"
| 70
| March 29
| Orlando
| 
| Doug Christie (20)
| Oliver Miller (11)
| Chauncey Billups (4)
| SkyDome16,876
| 15-55
|- bgcolor="ffcccc"
| 71
| March 31
| L.A. Lakers
| 
| Chauncey Billups (21)
| Marcus Camby, Gary Trent (7)
| Chauncey Billups, Oliver Miller (6)
| Maple Leaf Gardens16,086
| 15-56

|- bgcolor="ffcccc"
| 72
| April 1
| @ Atlanta
| 
| Doug Christie, Gary Trent (14)
| Marcus Camby, Tracy McGrady (9)
| Doug Christie (3)
| Georgia Dome10,441
| 15-57
|- bgcolor="ffcccc"
| 73
| April 3
| @ Washington
| 
| Dee Brown (30)
| Gary Trent (10)
| Dee Brown (6)
| MCI Center18,324
| 15-58
|- bgcolor="ffcccc"
| 74
| April 5
| @ Philadelphia
| 
| Gary Trent (25)
| Tracy McGrady (13)
| Dee Brown (6)
| CoreStates Center15,808
| 15-59
|- bgcolor="ffcccc"
| 75
| April 7
| @ Milwaukee
| 
| Doug Christie (20)
| Reggie Slater (8)
| Doug Christie (5)
| Bradley Center13,288
| 15-60
|- bgcolor="ffcccc"
| 76
| April 8
| Milwaukee
| 
| Gary Trent (24)
| Chauncey Billups, Tracy McGrady (9)
| Doug Christie (8)
| SkyDome14,168
| 15-61
|- bgcolor="ffcccc"
| 77
| April 10
| Miami
| 
| Doug Christie (26)
| Tracy McGrady (15)
| Doug Christie (7)
| SkyDome16,111
| 15-62
|- bgcolor="ffcccc"
| 78
| April 12
| New Jersey
| 
| Dee Brown (30)
| Marcus Camby (11)
| Tracy McGrady (6)
| SkyDome14,088
| 15-63
|- bgcolor="bbffbb"
| 79
| April 14
| @ New Jersey
| 
| Doug Christie (23)
| Marcus Camby (12)
| Chauncey Billups, Doug Christie (4)
| Continental Airlines Arena17,521
| 16-63
|- bgcolor="ffcccc"
| 80
| April 16
| @ New York
| 
| Doug Christie (14)
| Doug Christie, Tracy McGrady (7)
| Dee Brown (4)
| Madison Square Garden19,763
| 16-64
|- bgcolor="ffcccc"
| 81
| April 17
| @ Indiana
| 
| Doug Christie (24)
| Gary Trent (12)
| Chauncey Billups (5)
| Market Square Arena16,059
| 16-65
|- bgcolor="ffcccc"
| 82
| April 19
| Philadelphia
| 
| Doug Christie (16)
| Marcus Camby (11)
| Doug Christie (4)
| Copps Coliseum14,578
| 16-66

Player statistics

Regular season

* Statistics include only games with the Raptors

Awards and records

Transactions

References

External links
 1997–98 Toronto Raptors season at Basketball Reference
 1997–98 Toronto Raptors season at Database Basketball

Toronto Raptors seasons
Toronto
Tor